WASP-14b is an extrasolar planet discovered in 2008 by SuperWASP using the transit method. Follow-up radial velocity measurements showed that the mass of WASP-14b is almost eight times larger than that of Jupiter. The radius found by the transit observations show that it has a radius 25% larger than Jupiter. This makes WASP-14b one of the densest exoplanets known. Its radius best fits the model of Jonathan Fortney.

Orbit
First calculation of WASP-14b's Rossiter–McLaughlin effect and so spin-orbit angle was −14 ± 17 degrees. It is too eccentric for its age and so is possibly pulled into its orbit by another planet. The study in 2012 has updated spin-orbit angle to 33.1°.

References

External links

WASP Planets

Exoplanets discovered by WASP
Exoplanets discovered in 2008
Giant planets
Hot Jupiters
Transiting exoplanets
Boötes

de:WASP-14 b